David Christy Butler (December 15, 1829 – May 25, 1891) was a U.S. political figure.  He was the first governor of Nebraska, serving from 1867 until 1871. He was the first governor of Nebraska after statehood and the only Nebraska governor to date to be impeached.

Biography
Butler was born near Linton, Indiana, the eldest son of 10 children.  His education was limited to the common schools and he worked at farming and cattle trading. He married twice.  His first wife was Mary Pauline Smith Butler and his second was Lydia Story Butler.  He and Lydia were married on January 25, 1860, and he had eight children.

Career
Butler was nominated for a state senate seat in Indiana in 1856, but withdrew before the election. He moved three years later to Pawnee City, Nebraska, and engaged in trading cattle until his election to the Nebraska Territorial Legislature in 1861. He was elected to the Nebraska State Senate in 1863 and won the 1866 election to become Nebraska's first governor. During his second term (1869–1870), Butler moved the state's capital from Omaha to present-day Lincoln.

In the spring of 1871, soon after taking office for his third term, eleven articles of impeachment were brought against him. The first charged him with misuse of some $16,000 from the state school fund. Butler had allegedly made personal use of this money to purchase lots in the new city of Lincoln. He was suspended from office by the Supreme Court and subsequently tried by the State Senate. In his impeachment trial, he was convicted on the first charge, although the remaining ten were dropped. The Supreme Court then removed him from office on June 2, 1871.

In 1877, the Legislature reviewed its action and adopted a resolution expunging the impeachment proceedings from the record.  After ten years of retirement from public life, Butler was elected to the Nebraska State Senate on the Independent Ticket in 1882. Running on the Union Labor Ticket in 1888, he again sought the Governorship but was defeated.

Death and legacy
Following this defeat Butler retired to his home in Pawnee City, where he died on May 25, 1891, and is interred at Pawnee City Cemetery. Butler County in eastern Nebraska may have been named for him, but this is disputed, since records seem to indicate that the county was being referred to as "Butler County" before David Butler had served as Governor of Nebraska. Butler also may be the namesake of David City, Nebraska, but this is also disputed.

References

External links
  at the Nebraska State Historical Society

The Downfall Dictionary
National Governors Association

|-

1829 births
1891 deaths
19th-century American politicians
Governors of Nebraska
Impeached state and territorial governors of the United States removed from office
Members of the Nebraska Territorial Legislature
Nebraska Independents
Nebraska politicians convicted of crimes
Nebraska Republicans
Nebraska state senators
People from Greene County, Indiana
People from Pawnee City, Nebraska
Republican Party governors of Nebraska